The Bulgarian Basketball All-Star Game is an annual basketball event in Bulgaria, which has been organised by the Bulgarian Basketball Federation since 1990. It is the oldest All-Star basketball event organised in Eastern Europe and it featured legendary former NBA player Georgi Glouchkov in its first edition. Many others distinguished players have been selected since then including Mike Wilkinson, Vassil Evtimov, Priest Lauderdale, Pero Antic. The All-Star Game includes a match between a selection of the best players of the NBL League, a slam-dunk and a three-point contest. The starting five of each selection is chosen by online voting, but on some occasions the All-Star players have been chosen but the coaches.The last edition was played in 2017.

List of games
Bold: Team that won the game.

Three-Point Shoot Contest

Slam-Dunk Contest

Rodman and Muggsy Bogues in the All-Star Game
In 2012 the Bulgarian Basketball Federation presided by Georgi Glouchkov invited former NBA superstar Dennis Rodman to attend the 2012 All-Star Game as a special guest. Rodman arrived in Sofia and in a press conference he even express his desire to play in the event. Though he attended the event he finally did not play. Two years earlier Muggsy Bogues was invited by the Federation to attend the 2010 All-Star Game in Varna. He received a copy of jersey worn by Georgi Glouchkov in the first 1990 edition at the press conference. Bogues gave the of the match by throwing the first ball, and was a member of the jury evaluating the performances in the dunking competition.

References

Basketball all-star games
Basketball in Bulgaria